Sofia is the capital and largest city of Bulgaria.

Sofia may also refer to:

People
 Sofia (given name), alternate form of the given name Sophia
Sofia (Filipino singer), a bossa nova singer from the Philippines
Sofia (Swedish singer), full name Sofia Berntson

Places
Sofía (Echinades), an island of the Ionian Islands of Greece
Sofia, Drochia, a commune in Drochia district, Moldova
Sofia, Hînceşti, a commune in Hînceşti district, Moldova
Sofia, New Mexico, an unincorporated community in Union County, New Mexico, USA
Sofia Province, a province of Bulgaria
Sofia Region, a region in northern Madagascar
Sofia Valley, a valley in Bulgaria
The Sofia, an apartment building in New York City

Arts, entertainment, and media

Films
Sofia (1948 film), an American film shot in Mexico set in Sofia
Sofia (1987 film), a Argentine film
Sofia (2018 film), a Belgian film
Assassin's Bullet, a 2012 American film alternately titled Sofia in some international markets

Music
"Sofia" (Álvaro Soler song), 2016
"Sofia" (Clairo song), 2019

Other uses in arts, entertainment, and media
Sofia, a character in the Battle Arena Toshinden fighting game series
Sofia the First, a Disney television program starring Ariel Winter in the title role

Science and technology
SoFIA (Smart or Feature -phone with Intel Architecture) a microarchitecture design for Intel Atom chips
Stratospheric Observatory for Infrared Astronomy (SOFIA), a joint project of NASA and the German Aerospace Center (DLR) for an airborne telescope
Surround Optical Fiber Immunoassay (SOFIA), an ultra-sensitive diagnostic platform

See also
Hagia Sophia (disambiguation)
Sophia (disambiguation)
Santa Sofia (disambiguation)